The 1955 Moomba TT was a motor race staged at the Albert Park Circuit in Victoria, Australia on 26 March 1955. 
The race, which featured a Le Mans start, was open to 'Sports Cars Open and Closed', competing with restricted fuel.
It was staged as part of the Argus Moomba Motor Car Races, the meeting being sponsored by the Argus newspaper and organised by the Light Car Club of Australia in collaboration with the Albert Park Trust and the Moomba Festival Committee.

The race was won by Doug Whiteford (Triumph TR2) from Haig Hurst (Austin-Healey) and EJ Brotherton (Austin-Healey).

Race results

 Race distance: 32 laps, 100 miles (161 km)
 Number of entries in Official Programme: 40
 Number of starters: unknown
 Number of finishers: unknown
 Pole position: Allan Gray (Jaguar XK120 Coupe)
 Winner's race time: 78:27 (76.5 mph)
 Fastest lap: Doug Whiteford, (Triumph TR2), 2:23 (78.5 mph)

References

Moomba TT
Motorsport at Albert Park
March 1955 sports events in Australia